Rafael Humberto Morales de Leon (born 6 April 1988) is a Guatemalan professional footballer who plays as a defender for Liga Nacional club Comunicaciones.

Club career

CSD Comunicaciones (2008-2014 and 2015-present)
Morales began his career playing for Comunicaciones.

Deportivo Saprissa (2014-2015)
Saprissa announced the signing of Morales in June 2014. He scored his first goal in his debut against Mexican side León.

Career statistics

International goals
Scores and results list Guatemala's goal tally first.

Honours
Comunicaciones 
Liga Nacional de Guatemala: Apertura 2009, Clausura 2011, Apertura 2011, Clausura 2013, Apertura 2013, Clausura 2014, Apertura 2014, Clausura 2015, Clausura 2022
CONCACAF League: 2021

Saprissa
Liga FPD: Apertura 2014

References

1988 births
Living people
2014 Copa Centroamericana players
Guatemalan footballers
Guatemala international footballers
Comunicaciones F.C. players
Deportivo Saprissa players
Guatemalan expatriate footballers
Expatriate footballers in Costa Rica
Guatemalan expatriate sportspeople in Costa Rica
People from Sacatepéquez Department
Association football defenders
Guatemala under-20 international footballers
Guatemala youth international footballers